The 2010 FIBA Europe Under-16 Championship Division B was an international basketball competition held in Estonia in 2010.

Medalists
1.   Czech Republic

2.   Ukraine 

3.   Slovenia

Final ranking (comparative)
1.  Czech Republic

2.  Ukraine

3.  Georgia

4.  Slovenia

5.  Slovakia

6.  Netherlands

7.  Hungary

8.  Portugal

9.  Finland

10.  England

11.  Estonia

12.  Switzerland

13.  Luxembourg

14.  Belgium

15.  Sweden

16.  Austria

17.  Ireland

18.  Romania

19.  Belarus

20.  Norway

External links
FIBA Archive

FIBA U16 European Championship Division B
2010–11 in European basketball
2010–11 in Estonian basketball
International youth basketball competitions hosted by Estonia